The 2012 Little Caesars Pizza Bowl, the 16th edition of the game, was a post-season American college football bowl game that was held on December 26, 2012 at Ford Field in Detroit, Michigan as part of the 2012–13 NCAA football bowl season.

The game was telecasted at 7:30 pm ET on ESPN.  It featured the Western Kentucky Hilltoppers from the Sun Belt Conference against the Central Michigan Chippewas from the Mid-American Conference and was the final game of the 2012 NCAA Division I FBS football season for both teams.  The Hilltoppers accepted their invitation after finishing 7–5 during their regular season, while the Chippewas accepted theirs after finishing 6–6. Central Michigan won the game by a score of 24-21 over Western Kentucky.

Teams
Under normal circumstances, the Little Caesars Pizza Bowl would feature the eighth bowl-eligible team from the Big Ten Conference against the Mid-American Conference champions.  However, with the Big Ten only fielding seven bowl-eligible teams and the MAC champion Northern Illinois Huskies playing in the 2013 Orange Bowl, the spots were open this year.

This was the first meeting between these two teams.

Central Michigan

The Chippewas finished in fourth place in the MAC's West Division, also finishing with a 4–4 conference record.  After claiming a 6–6 mark in the regular season, the Chippewas accepted an invite to the 2012 Little Caesars Pizza Bowl.

This was the Chippewas' fourth Little Caesars Pizza Bowl; thus far their record in the game was 1–2, defeating the Middle Tennessee Blue Raiders 31–14 in the 2006 game, but losing to the Purdue Boilermakers 51–48 in the 2007 game and to the Florida Atlantic Owls 24–21 in the 2008 game.

WKU

The Hilltoppers finished in fifth place in the Sun Belt Conference with a 4–4 record.  After claiming a 7–5 mark in the regular season, the Hilltoppers accepted an invite to the 2012 Little Caesars Pizza Bowl.

This was the first bowl game in school history for the Hilltoppers, being one of two teams making their bowl debut this season (along with fellow Sun Belt member the Louisiana–Monroe Warhawks).

On December 7, Hilltoppers head coach Willie Taggart accepted the vacant head coaching position at South Florida. Defensive coordinator Lance Guidry was named as interim head coach for the bowl game. Although WKU hired Bobby Petrino as Taggart's permanent replacement three days later, it announced that Guidry would still coach in Detroit.

This was Guidry's second stint as an interim head coach at an FBS program. He had previously been interim coach at Miami (OH) in the 2010–11 bowl season, coaching the RedHawks to a win in the 2011 GoDaddy.com Bowl. His coaching stint at Miami was most noted for his locker-room speech to the RedHawks just before the bowl, a 90-second reflection on the history of the program that went viral.  The win made the 2010 RedHawks the first team in FBS history to follow a 10-loss season with a 10-win season.

Game summary

Scoring summary

Statistics

References

Little Caesars Pizza Bowl
Little Caesars Pizza Bowl
Central Michigan Chippewas football bowl games
Western Kentucky Hilltoppers football bowl games
Little Caesars Pizza Bowl
Little Caesars Pizza Bowl
Little Caesars Pizza Bowl